Titicus may refer to:

Titicus River, a tributary of the Croton River in New York and Connecticut

Connecticut:
Titicus, Connecticut
Titicus Mountain

New York:
Titicus Reservoir, Westchester County
New York State Route 116, a section of which is known as Titicus Road